The 2005–06 Israeli Women's Cup (Gvia HaMedina Nashim) was the 8th season of Israel's women's nationwide football cup competition.

The competition was won, for the third consecutive time, by Maccabi Holon, who had beaten ASA Tel Aviv University 5–1 in the final.

Results

Final

References
Israel - List of Women Cup Winners rsssf.com

Israel Women's Cup seasons
Cup
Israel